Kasey McCravey (born March 1, 1994) is an American rugby player.

McCravey began playing rugby after attending West Point, where she played softball.

Personal life
McCravey attended Desert Mountain High School and graduated in 2012. At West Point, she majored in Kinesiology. She is currently a Captain in the US Army and participates in the Army's World Class Athlete Program (WCAP).

References

External links 
 Kasey McCravey at USA Rugby
 
 

1994 births
Living people
American female rugby union players
United States women's international rugby union players
Army Black Knights softball players
U.S. Army World Class Athlete Program